Esko Saira (born June 14, 1938, in Lemi, South Karelia) is a Finnish biathlete and Olympic medalist. He received a silver medal at the 1972 Winter Olympics in Sapporo with the Finnish team.

At the 1976 Winter Olympics in Innsbruck he again received a team silver medal.

References

1938 births
Living people
People from Lemi
Finnish male biathletes
Olympic biathletes of Finland
Biathletes at the 1972 Winter Olympics
Biathletes at the 1976 Winter Olympics
Olympic silver medalists for Finland
Olympic medalists in biathlon
Biathlon World Championships medalists
Medalists at the 1976 Winter Olympics
Medalists at the 1972 Winter Olympics
Sportspeople from South Karelia